Delahey is a suburb in Melbourne, Victoria, Australia,  north-west of Melbourne's Central Business District, located within the City of Brimbank local government area. Delahey recorded a population of 8,077 at the 2021 census.

History

Delahey originally contained several farming properties. The Government acquired the land in the mid-to-late 1980s for re-subdivision as mostly residential properties. The suburb is named after William Delahey, who whilst still a baby, had arrived from Ireland with his parents and siblings Henry Delahey and Mary (née Dodd) in June 1840. William Delahey had been connected with the Keilor Shire Council for 18 years and was elected president for 1882–83. The suburb's name was formally adopted in 1994.

Facilities

Education
 MacKellar Primary School
 Copperfield College – Senior Campus

See also
 City of Keilor – Delahey was previously within this former local government area.

References

Suburbs of Melbourne
Suburbs of the City of Brimbank